Andrew Hall (born 1975) is a South African cricketer.

Andrew or Andy Hall may also refer to:

 Andrew Hall (actor) (1954–2019), English actor and director
 Andrew Hall (English cricketer) (born 1973), English cricketer
 Andrew Hall (hedge fund manager), British hedge fund manager and former head of Phibro
 Andrew Hall (RAF officer), Commandant General RAF Regiment
 Andrew Hall (rugby union) (born 1979), Scotland international rugby union player
 Andy Hall (American football) (born 1980), American football player
 Andy Hall (activist) (born 1979), British lawyer and migration expert
 Andrew Hall, drummer for Destroy Destroy Destroy and The Showdown